Child Care Management System or CCMS, is an Australian national child care system that aims to bring all approved child care services online.

Centres must through registered software record child, enrolment and attendance information to the Department of Education, Employment and Workplace Relations (DEEWR). This allows for the department to calculate payment of Child Care Benefit (CCB) fee reductions on behalf of children in their service. CCBs are payments from the Government of Australia to child care services to take care of children.

References

External links
DEEWR page with information on and list of approved CCMS software providers.
https://web.archive.org/web/20140731235552/http://education.gov.au/child-care-management-system-new-child-care-services
http://www.mychild.gov.au/sites/mychild/childcare-information/pages/benefit
https://www.childcarecoursesinadelaide.com.au/blog/a-rewarding-career-in-childcare-course-adelaide/

Child care
Child care skills organizations